A by-election for the seat of Rylstone in the New South Wales Legislative Assembly was held on 14 October 1895 because the Committee of Elections and Qualifications declared that the election of John Fitzpatrick at the election for Rylstone in July, with a margin of 6 votes, was void because of gross negligence by the returning officer by not initialing 266 ballot papers (19.6%).

Dates

Result

The election for Rylstone in July was declared void.

See also
Electoral results for the district of Rylstone
List of New South Wales state by-elections

Notes

References

1895 elections in Australia
New South Wales state by-elections
1890s in New South Wales